NGC 5653 is an unbarred spiral galaxy in the constellation Boötes. It was discovered on March 13, 1785 by John Herschel and subsequently placed in the New General Catalogue.

References

 IRAS F14280+3126
 http://hubblesite.org/

External links
 
 HubbleSite NewsCenter:  NGC 5653

Boötes
5653
51814
09318
Unbarred spiral galaxies